İrəvanlı is a village and municipality in the Tartar District of Azerbaijan. It has a population of 1,603.  The municipality consists of the villages of İrəvanlı, Gapanly, and Hajally.

References

Populated places in Tartar District